Daniel Alejandro Suárez Garza (born January 7, 1992) is a Mexican professional stock car racing driver. He competes full-time in the NASCAR Cup Series, driving the No. 99 Chevrolet Camaro ZL1 for Trackhouse Racing Team. He previously drove in the NASCAR Toyota Series in Mexico for Telcel Racing, and the NASCAR K&N Pro Series East for Rev Racing as a member of the Drive for Diversity program. Suárez also previously competed in the NASCAR Xfinity Series, where he won the series championship in 2016 with Joe Gibbs Racing, becoming the first non-American to win a major NASCAR National Series championship.

Racing career

Early career

A native of Monterrey in Nuevo León, Suárez began his racing career in karting in 2002. In 2007, he won the class championship. In 2008, he moved to the preliminary category of NASCAR Mexico, Mini-Stocks, where he became the youngest driver to win a race in the series. He moved to the NASCAR Mexico Series in 2010, driving for Telcel Racing and winning the series' Rookie of the Year title. In 2011, Suárez participated in the Toyota All-Star Showdown at Irwindale Speedway, finishing in 11th, the highest-finishing Mexican driver in the event. In the 2011 NASCAR Mexico Series, he finished the season with three poles and a podium, finishing ninth in the standings. At the same time, he participated in 7 races of the NASCAR K&N Pro Series East.

In 2012, he alternated his time between the Mexico Series and K&N Pro Series East. In Mexico, he led the points for most of the season and entered the final race of the year in contention for the championship, but wound up finishing third, having scored two victories. In the K&N Pro Series East, he finished in sixteenth place in the overall standings, achieving 3 top-10s in nine races.

Suárez competed for the full season in the K&N Pro Series East in 2013, driving a Toyota for Rev Racing. He scored his first victory in the series at Columbus Motor Speedway, also recorded six top-5 and nine top-ten finishes on his way to third in the championship standings. Meanwhile, he finished runner-up of the NASCAR Toyota Series achieved 3 wins and five podium finishes in the season. Suárez was also named to NASCAR's Drive for Diversity program during the 2013 season.

In 2014, Suárez returned to the K&N East and Toyota Series, winning the first two K&N East and first Toyota Series races of the season. In April, he was selected by Joe Gibbs Racing to make his debut in the Nationwide Series at Richmond International Raceway, driving the team's No. 20 Toyota; he finished 19th.

2015
In August 2014, it was announced that Suárez would compete full-time in the 2015 NASCAR Xfinity Series in the No. 18 Toyota for Joe Gibbs Racing and that he would also run a partial schedule in the 2015 NASCAR Camping World Truck Series in the No. 51 Toyota for Kyle Busch Motorsports.

On July 4, 2015, Suárez won the pole for the Xfinity Series Subway Firecracker 250 at Daytona, his first career pole in the series. Suárez would go on to win 2 more poles at Iowa and Kentucky and won his first ARCA pole at Kansas. Suárez went on to win the 2015 NASCAR Xfinity Series rookie of the year title edging Darrell Wallace Jr. for the award by one single top ten finish in statistics. Suárez finished the season 5th in points.

2016

In 2016, Suárez's car number in the Xfinity Series was switched to No. 19. He won his first Xfinity Series race at Michigan, by passing Kyle Busch on the last lap, becoming the first Mexican-born driver to win in a NASCAR national touring series. Suárez won his second Xfinity Series race during the Round of 12 in the Chase at Dover in October. With this win, he would advance to the Round of 8. In November, Suárez won his first Camping World Truck Series race at Phoenix, taking the lead late in the race after William Byron lost an engine. In the season-ending Xfinity Series race at Homestead, Suárez dominated the race and took the lead on the final restart with 2 laps to go to score his first Xfinity Series championship. Suárez became the first foreign-born driver to win a NASCAR national series championship.

2017

After the retirement of Carl Edwards, Suárez was tapped to drive the No. 19 Arris / Stanley Tools-sponsored Toyota for JGR. He was paired up with crew chief Dave Rogers. In his first Advance Auto Parts Clash he finished eighth after starting 16th. Suárez scored a pair of seventh-place finishes at Phoenix and Auto Club. Shortly before the Martinsville race, Suárez's crew chief, Rogers, took an indefinite leave of absence. He was replaced by Scott Graves, who was Suárez's crew chief when he won the 2016 Xfinity Series championship. In May, Suárez won the final stage of the Monster Energy Open, which allowed him to advance into the All-Star Race. In June, Suárez opened the month by finishing a career-best sixth at Dover. Later in the month, Suárez joined MDM Motorsports at Sonoma Raceway for the K&N Pro Series West race, his and MDM's debuts in the series. After qualifying seventh, he finished 11th. Later in the summer, Suárez earned a series of four consecutive finishes of seventh or better, including a third-place finish at Watkins Glen and a Stage 2 winner over stage leader Martin Truex Jr.

During the season, Suárez was involved in controversy from one of his sponsors, Subway. During a publicity event with the help of NBC Sports at the New Hampshire Motor Speedway in July, he gave out free Dunkin Donuts to fans camping in the infield and the surrounding areas of the track. Nearly two months later, Subway decided to pull out with a race remaining on their contract. After the announcement, Camping World owner Marcus Lemonis tweeted his intention to sponsor Suárez, which took place at Talladega's Alabama 500. Suárez also ran 14 Xfinity Series races with a best finish of second at the fall Bristol race to his teammate Kyle Busch.

2018
During the 2018 season, Suárez won his first career Cup Series pole at Pocono, after Kevin Harvick and Kyle Busch's qualifying times were disallowed following an inspection. He also scored a career-best second place in the race. Suárez, however, struggled to stay consistent throughout the season with three top-fives and nine top-10 finishes. On October 9, 2018, Rogers returned to replace Graves as Suárez's crew chief.

On September 21, 2018, it was reported that Suárez removed all references to Joe Gibbs Racing from his Twitter profile, hinting that he will be out of the team by the end of the 2018 season. On November 7, 2018, it was announced that Suárez will be replaced by Martin Truex Jr. in 2019.

2019

On January 7, 2019, it was announced that Suárez signed with Stewart-Haas Racing to drive the No. 41 Ford Mustang GT in the 2019 season. In addition, Suárez brought in Arris to sponsor the team. During qualifying for the 2019 TicketGuardian 500 at Phoenix, Suárez had an on-track incident with Michael McDowell, which resulted in a fight on pit road. Despite showing signs of improvement in performance, Suárez failed to make the 2019 playoffs after finishing 11th after an on-track incident with Matt Tifft that caused a caution at Indianapolis. On November 14, 2019, it was announced that Suárez would not return to the No. 41 car in 2020.

2020

On January 28, 2020, Suárez officially signed with Gaunt Brothers Racing to race the No. 96 Toyota full-time in 2020. Despite being eligible, he did not participate in the 2020 Busch Clash to focus on the 2020 Daytona 500. Suárez failed to make the Daytona 500 after finishing 22nd in Duel 1 of the 2020 Bluegreen Vacations Duels when he collided with Ryan Blaney in turn 4. Suárez made his official debut with GBR at Las Vegas a week later, but he experienced mechanical issues before the opening lap, resulting in him finishing 30th with four laps down. Throughout the season, he struggled to make a decent finish, with his highest being two 18th place finishes at Bristol and Kansas.

On September 14, 2020, Suárez announced he would not return to Gaunt Brothers Racing at the end of the season. On October 7, 2020, he announced that he will join Justin Marks' new Trackhouse Racing Team in 2021.

2021

For the 2021 season, Suárez joined the No. 99 car for Trackhouse Racing. The No. 99 was last used by Carl Edwards, whom he replaced at JGR (with Edwards giving both Suárez and Trackhouse his blessing for the number). Suárez's run with Trackhouse was seen by many as his best, and very likely his last, chance at resurrecting his career after his struggles the previous few seasons. Although it took time for Suárez and the team to gel, Trackhouse quickly gained a reputation for competitiveness and on-track action during the season with Suárez behind the wheel.

During the 2021 season, Suárez scored Trackhouse's first top five with a fourth place finish at the Bristol dirt race. Suárez also scored top tens at Dover, Nashville, and Texas. Suárez also competed in the Trans-Am race in Nashville for Marks' SCCA team.

2022: First Cup win

Suárez returned to Trackhouse for the 2022 season after the team acquired multiple charters from Chip Ganassi Racing. In February 2022, Suárez and Trackhouse expanded a sponsorship deal with Freeway Insurance, granting the company primary sponsorship rights for five events throughout the 2022 NASCAR Cup series. At Sonoma, Suárez became the first Mexican-born driver to win a Cup Series race. Suárez was eliminated in the Round of 12 after finishing 36th at the Charlotte Roval. He finished the season at a career-best 10th in the points standings.

In the Truck Series, Suárez relieved an injured Carson Hocevar on lap 11 of the Sonoma race, bringing the No. 42 truck to a sixth place finish.

Personal life
Suárez resides in Huntersville, North Carolina. Suárez is engaged to Julia Piquet, daughter of three-time Formula 1 World Champion Nelson Piquet.

In popular culture
In 2017, Suárez voiced the character Daniel "Danny" Swérvez in the Pixar film Cars 3.

In 2019, Suárez made a cameo in the movie Stuber.

Motorsports career results

NASCAR
(key) (Bold – Pole position awarded by qualifying time. Italics – Pole position earned by points standings or practice time. * – Most laps led.)

Cup Series

Daytona 500

Xfinity Series

Camping World Truck Series

 Season still in progress 
 Ineligible for series points

K&N Pro Series East

K&N Pro Series West

Toyota Series

ARCA Racing Series
(key) (Bold – Pole position awarded by qualifying time. Italics – Pole position earned by points standings or practice time. * – Most laps led.)

References

External links

 

Living people
1992 births
Sportspeople from Monterrey
Racing drivers from Nuevo León
NASCAR drivers
ARCA Menards Series drivers
Mexican racing drivers
Kyle Busch Motorsports drivers
Joe Gibbs Racing drivers
Stewart-Haas Racing drivers
NASCAR Xfinity Series champions